Phyllocnistis habrochroa is a moth of the family Gracillariidae, known from Karnataka, India. The hostplant for the species is Abatia stellata. It was named by E. Meyrick in 1915.

References

Phyllocnistis
Endemic fauna of India
Moths of Asia